This is the list of notable stars in the constellation Musca, sorted by decreasing brightness.

See also
List of stars by constellation

Notes

References

List
Musca